Holhudhoo (Dhivehi: ހޮޅުދޫ) is one of the inhabited islands of Noonu Atoll. The island is second most populous island in the atoll with 2038.

History
The island's current population has been pretty recent, with estimated immigration of nearby islanders from 17th to 19th century. But a cemetery was discovered in the middle of the island, which proves that an older population has been living or has lived and abandoned the island before the current inhabitants.

In the Maldivian history, mention of Holhudhoo has been scarce. One notable case was of Holhudhoo Nevin, whose family played a large part in the Maldives history in 19th and early 20th century.

Toponymy
The name Holhudhoo means Little island  Holhu, Hulhu means little  and Dhoo mean island.as opposed to Meedhoo or maadhoo meaning large island.

Geography

Demography

Holhudhoo population is a mix of people from all over Maldives. The total population of the island is 2038.

Resident Population (Census 2006)1,527  (The remaining Population works in resorts and resides in capital Male' for education and jobs)

Male  680 
Female  847
Age structure 
0-18  722
19-25 174
26-64
503
65+128
Annual Growth Rate- 0.38
Sex Ratio 80.28

Governance

The island is administered by three elected councillors who are elected for a term of three years. The current members were elected from the Maldivian Democratic Party (MDP), and Maldives Development Alliance.

Holhudhoo shares a parliamentary district with Miladhoo and Magoodhoo called Holhudhoo Dhaairaa. The current member of parliament is Ali Mohamed (Alibe) elected as a member of MDP, but later joined PPM.

Economy

Holhudhoo's economy has been fishing and agriculture based until the early 1990s. The island current economy is supported by people working in the resorts and construction industry.

In the island jobs are mainly provided by Meynaa School, Island Council, Health center and utilities.

In addition, shops and restaurants also provide jobs.

Education

The island boasts one of the oldest schools in Maldives. Meynaa School was found in 1947 by Ibrahim Meynaa Kaleyfaanu. The school currently teaches up to 12th standard. in addition Holhudhoo Pre School provide education for small children. The islands Literacy Rate is 96.73.

Health

Holhudhoo has a health center, which can cater for minor diseases and public health. However for major health problems, the people usually take a boat ride to Manadhoo Atoll Health center, Ugoofaaru Regional Hospital or Male'.

References

Islands of the Maldives